Cherry Springs Dance Hall,  was one of the oldest and most historic dance halls in Texas.  It was located at 17662 North U.S. Highway 87, Cherry Springs, TX 78624. The Texas farming community of Cherry Spring is  NW of Fredericksburg, Texas, in Gillespie County's portion of the Texas Hill Country. The dance hall was established along the old Pinta Trail in 1889 as a stop for cattle drives.  It was originally run by Herman Lehmann, son of German immigrants, Apache captive and adopted son of Comanche chief Quanah Parker.

Cited by the State of Texas Music Office as "one of the most historic dance halls in the world,"  the venue played host to some of the greatest legends of country music.  Hank Williams once played here, as did Patsy Cline, Buck Owens, Webb Pierce, Ernest Tubb, George Jones, and many others.  It was here on October 9, 1955, that the Louisiana Hayride Tour played, with Elvis Presley, Johnny Cash, Wanda Jackson and Porter Wagoner on the cusp of international fame for the performers.  Author and musician Geronimo Trevino III likens the talent who have played there to "The history of country music."

See also
 Enchanted Rock
 Loyal Valley, Texas
 Texas Hill Country

References

Bibliography

External links

 State of Texas, Office of the Governor, Texas Music Office
 Honky Tonk Texas
  VisWiki Visual Wikipedia

Music venues in Texas
Buildings and structures in Gillespie County, Texas
German-American culture in Texas
Music venues completed in 1889
Texas Hill Country
Elvis Presley
1889 establishments in Texas